Philip "Philly" Larkin (born 26 July 1973) is an Irish sportsperson.  He plays hurling with his local club James Stephens and was a member of the Kilkenny senior inter-county team from 1996 until 2003.

Biography

Born in the famous 'village' area of Kilkenny, Larkin was a member of the famous Larkin hurling dynasty.  His father Phil, known as 'Fan' Larkin, won five All-Ireland medals with Kilkenny in a career that spanned seventeen seasons.  Larkin's grandfather, Paddy, and his grand-uncle, Mick, featured on the Kilkenny team throughout the 1930s and collected final All-Ireland titles between them.

References

 

1973 births
Living people
Irish electricians
James Stephens hurlers
Kilkenny inter-county hurlers
People from Kilkenny (city)